Jarosław Godek (born 5 August 1981 in Szubin, Poland) is a Polish rower. He finished 6th in the men's coxless four at the 2004 Summer Olympics.  In 2008, he and team-mate Piotr Hojka reached the C-final in the men's coxless pair.  At the 2012 Summer Olympics he reached the semi-final of the men's coxless pairs with team-mate Wojciech Gutorski.

References

External links 
 
 

1981 births
Living people
Polish male rowers
Olympic rowers of Poland
Rowers at the 2004 Summer Olympics
Rowers at the 2008 Summer Olympics
Rowers at the 2012 Summer Olympics
People from Nakło County
Sportspeople from Kuyavian-Pomeranian Voivodeship
European Rowing Championships medalists